Howard Poole (15 August 1905 – 20 January 1966) was a Welsh international rugby union scrum-half who played club rugby for Cardiff. Although never playing for Wales he was selected to play in the 1930 British Lions tour of New Zealand and Australia.

International matches played

British Lions
 1930

Bibliography

References 

1905 births
1966 deaths
British & Irish Lions rugby union players from Wales
Cardiff RFC players
Rugby union players from Cardiff
Rugby union scrum-halves
Welsh rugby union players